Animal World or The Animal World may refer to:

Animal World (short story collection), by Antonio di Benedetto
Animal World (TV series), 1968–1971 wildlife program
Animal World (film), a 2018 Chinese adventure action film
The Animal World (film), a 1956 documentary film directed by Irwin Allen
"The Animal World", a song by Grandaddy from their 2006 album Just Like the Fambly Cat

See also
Animal Kingdom (disambiguation)
Animal Planet, a television network